Zayn al-Abidin (also spelled Zeynel Abidin, Zainal Abidin or Zeynelabidin) may refer to:

 Ali ibn Husayn Zayn al-Abidin (657–713), great-grandson of Muhammad
 Zain-ul-Abidin (reigned 1420–1470), Eight Sultan of Kashmir
 Mohd Zaiza Zainal Abidin (born 1986), Malaysian footballer 
 Zainal Abidin (governor), former Governor of North Sumatra
 Zainal Abidin of Ternate (reigned 1486-1500), first Sultan of Ternate
 Zainal Abidin III of Terengganu (1866–1918), Monarch of Terengganu
 Zainal Abidin Abdul Malik (1967-1996), Singaporean murderer
 Zainal Abidin Ahmad (politician) (1939–2010), Malaysian politician
 Zainal Abidin Ahmad (writer) (1895–1973), Malaysian writer
 Zainal Abidin (actor) (1928–2000), Indonesian actor
 Zaynolabideen Ghorbani (bone 1933), Iranian Shia Cleric
 Zeynel Abidin Erdem (born 1944), Turkish business tycoon
 Zeynelabidîn Zinar (born 1953), Kurdish writer and researcher
 Zainal Abidin Hassan (born 1963), Malaysian footballer
 Mizan Zainal Abidin of Terengganu (born 1962), Sultan of Terengganu, Malaysia
 Zulfadli Zainal Abidin (born 1988), Singaporean footballer
, Iranian Politician

See also
 Abidin
 Zainul Abidin of Aceh
 Zainal (disambiguation)
 Zeynel

Arabic masculine given names
Turkish masculine given names